Angad Aulakh is an American filmmaker. His feature directorial debut Autumn Lights, released in theaters in North America on October 21, 2016. He produced the film for his company Last Carnival with Guy Kent.

Life and career
Aulakh produced Autumn Lights for his company Last Carnival with Guy Kent, alongside Ashley M. Kent, Davíd Óskar Ólafsson and Árni Filippusson, producers of Ragnar Bragason's Metalhead and David Gordon Green's Prince Avalanche.

Aulakh was nominated for Best Director at the 2017 Riviera International Film Festival for Autumn Lights alongside Xavier Dolan for It's Only the End of the World, winner Amanda Kernell for Baden Baden and Academy Award-nominated filmmaker Ciro Guerra for Embrace of the Serpent. The film was also nominated for the Grand Jury Prize for Best Picture, Aulakh sharing the nomination with producers Guy Kent, Ashley M. Kent, David Oskar Olafsson, and Arni Filippusson.

Autumn Lights was nominated by Norway's Cinema Scandinavia for Best Picture in Fall 2016.

Filmography

Film

Awards
2022 Cult Critic Movie Awards

References

External links

, Deadline Hollywood
Director Angad Aulakh, Screen Daily, July 2016
Autumn Lights Trailer YouTube
Autumn Lights Trailer YouTube

American film directors
1988 births
Living people